Una-May O'Reilly is an American computer scientist and leader of the Anyscale Learning For All (ALFA) group at the MIT Computer Science and Artificial Intelligence Laboratory.

Early life and education 
O'Reilly earned her undergraduate degree at the University of Calgary. She was a graduate student at the Carleton University, where she studied computer science. During her doctorate O'Reilly worked as a graduate fellow at the Santa Fe Institute. Her dissertation was one of the first to explore genetic programming.  She joined the MIT Computer Science and Artificial Intelligence Laboratory as a postdoctoral fellow in 1996.

Research and career 
O'Reilly is a principal research scientist at the MIT Computer Science and Artificial Intelligence Laboratory, where she leads a team focusing on scalable machine learning. Her research group, Anyscale Learning For All (ALFA), conducts research in cybersecurity, rapid intelligent data analytics and the modelling of medical data. O'Reilly has designed computational models for a variety of different problems, including calculating the financial risk of renewable energy investments and creating a flavor algorithm that replaces taste testers. O'Reilly has developed statistical models to inform the design of renewable energy systems, including predicting wind speed.

In 2013 she was awarded the EvoStar award for Outstanding Contribution to Evolutionary Computation in Europe. O'Reilly has received various awards and honours for her work in genetic programming; including being elected to the Executive Board of the ACM Special Interest Group on Genetic and Evolutionary Computation, SIGevo (formerly International Society of Genetic and Evolutionary Computation).

Select publications

References 

Living people
Year of birth missing (living people)
Massachusetts Institute of Technology people
Carleton University alumni
University of Calgary alumni
American women computer scientists
American computer scientists
21st-century American women